A crime is an act that violates the law, though the word sometimes describes anti-social behaviors outside of a legal context.

Crime, Crimes, or The Crime may also refer to:

Geography
Crime Lake, a lake in Greater Manchester, England

Books
The Crime Book, by Cathy Scott, Shanna Hogan, Rebecca Morris, Lee Mellor, and Michael Kerrigan, 2017
Crime (novel), by Irvine Welsh, 2008
The Crime (Mahfouz book), 1973
The Crime (novel) (French: Un crime), by Georges Bernanos, 1935

Film and TV
The Crime (film), a 2022 Egyptian film
A Crime, a thriller film directed by Manuel Pradal (2006)
"The Crime", an episode of Your Favorite Story (1954)
 Irvine Welsh's Crime, a TV series by BritBox based on the 2008 novel by Irvine Welsh

Music
Crime (band), an early punk rock band from the U.S. city of San Francisco, California
Crim3s, a witch house duo from London
Crimes (album), an album by the post-hardcore band The Blood Brothers
"Crime", a song by Stina Nordenstam from the 1994 album And She Closed Her Eyes
"The Crime", a song by Prince featuring Kim Basinger Prince, John L. Nelson Scandalous!

Acronyms
CRIME, a security exploit against the HTTPS protocol

See also
Criminal (disambiguation)
Crime fiction, the fictional treatment of crimes and their detection and criminals and their motives
Legal Crime, a 1997 video game by Byte Enchanters